The Laser Radial or ILCA 6 is a popular one-design class of small sailing dinghy, originally built by Laser Performance. It is a singlehanded boat, meaning that it is sailed by one person. The Laser Radial is a variant of the Laser standard, with shorter mast and reduced sail area, allowing light sailors to sail in heavy winds. The International Class is recognised by World Sailing.

Events

Olympics
The Laser Radial was chosen for singlehanded women discipline at the Summer Olympic starting with the 2008 summer games regatta in Qingdao, China.

World championships

Men's Laser Radial World Championship

Women's Laser Radial World Championship

Men's Youth Laser Radial World Championship

Men's Youth Under 21 Laser Radial World Championship

Men's Youth Under 17 Laser Radial World Championship

Youth Sailing World Championships

Boys

Girls

Women's Youth Laser Radial World Championship

Women's Youth (Under 21) Laser Radial World Championship

Women's Youth (Under 17) Laser Radial World Championship

Open Apprentice Masters Laser Radial World Championship

Open Masters Laser Radial World Championship

Open Grand Masters Laser Radial World Championship

Open Great Grand Masters Laser Radial World Championship

See also
Laser (dinghy)
Laser 4.7
Men's Laser Radial World Championships
Women's Laser Radial World Championships

References

External links

 International Laser Association
 Web site of a manufacturer, LaserPerformance
 History of the Laser Class
 ISAF Laser Radial Class

Laser Radial
Olympic sailing classes
Classes of World Sailing
Dinghies